Admesturius is a genus of South American jumping spiders that was first described by María Elena Galiano in 1988.  it contains only three species, found only in Argentina and Chile: A. bitaeniatus, A. mariaeugeniae, and A. schajovskoyi.

References

 
Salticidae genera
Spiders of South America